Zoeken naar Eileen may refer to:

 Zoeken naar Eileen W., a novel by Leon de Winter
 Zoeken naar Eileen (film), a 1987 Dutch film, based on the novel